Mustafa Masi Nayyem is an Afghan-Ukrainian journalist, MP, lecturer at the Kyiv School of Economics, and public figure who was influential in sparking the Euromaidan in Ukraine. Since January 2023 Nayyem is the head of the State Agency for Restoration and Infrastructure Development. Prior to this he was Deputy Minister of Infrastructure appointed in August 2021.

Formerly, before his bureaucratic career Nayyem was a reporter for the newspaper "Kommersant Ukraine", the TVi channel, and the Internet newspaper Ukrayinska Pravda. He also participates in Ukrainian journalists' anti-censorship movement, "Stop the censorship!" (Stop tsenzuri!), and Hromadske.TV. In the parliamentary elections he was elected to the Ukrainian parliament on the list of Petro Poroshenko Bloc. Nayyem did not take part in the 2019 Ukrainian parliamentary election.

Personal life and education
Nayyem was born in Kabul in 1981 and lived in an elite district near the Taj Beg palace. In 1984, ten days after his younger brother Masi Nayyem was born, their mother died. He has stated that he is a Pashtun, a "Muslim by birth", and his native tongue is Dari. In Afghanistan, his father, Muhammad Naim, had been Minister of Education and was responsible for the construction of educational facilities before the USSR invasion of Afghanistan in December 1979. After the Soviet invasion, his father did not want to work for the Soviets and quit his post. In 1987 and because of the destruction of the ongoing Soviet Union's War in Afghanistan, his father went to Moscow to study and met Ukrainian Valentina Kolechko whom he later married in early 1989. Mustafa Nayyem became fluent in Russian and Ukrainian after he moved with his father to Moscow in August 1989 living near the Nakhimovsky Prospekt metro station and later to Kyiv in 1990 attending 61st school near the Lukyanivsky market.

Nayyem graduated from the Technical Lyceum in Kyiv in 1998, and the Aerospace Systems Department of Kyiv Polytechnic Institute in 2004. He speaks fluent Ukrainian, Pashto, Russian, and English.

He and Anastasia Ivanova who is from Lviv and was a photographer for Kommersant-Ukraine, have a son, Mark-Mikhei (born 13 January 2008), and both mother and son are Jewish.

His brother Masi Nayem is a lawyer and, in April 2016, deployed as a Ukrainian paratrooper to the Donbas - Avdiivka industrial zone which was the hottest point of  the Russo-Ukrainian War. During the 2022 full scale Russian invasion of Ukraine Masi Nayem returned to the front. On 5 June 2022 his brother Mustafa Nayyem reported that he had been seriously injured.

Career

Journalism
Nayyem worked as a reporter for the Kommersant-Ukrainy newspaper from 2005 to 2007, and then for Shuster LIVE, a political talk show on Ukrainian television, from 2007 to 2011.

In 2009, Nayyem received national attention following Ukrayina TV channel's live discussion with then-presidential candidate Viktor Yanukovych. During the discussion, he questioned Yanukovych about the latter's acquisition of the Mezhyhirya Residence. In 2010, Nayem was briefly detained by police officers, reportedly as a result of racial profiling for "persons of Caucasian appearance" (a common local term for people from the Caucasus). The following day, Nayem wrote an article in which described the events that led to his detention. He stated, "Xenophobia should not become the face of Ukrainian nationality" and requested the firing of one of the officers responsible.

Nayyem frequently contributes news and articles to Ukrayinska Pravda. From September 2011 to late April 2013, he worked for the Ukrainian television channel TVi. After resigning due to a conflict with the channel's new management, he started a web project together with colleagues who also left the channel. Their project was named Hromadske.TV.

Activism
Using Facebook, Nayem was one of the first activists to urge Ukrainians to gather on Maidan Nezalezhnosti (Independence Square) in Kyiv to protest Viktor Yanukovych's decision to "pause" preparations for signing the European Union–Ukraine Association Agreement (with the European Union). His post on Facebook on November 21, 2013, was a summons to rally for the Euromaidan protests which led to the overthrow of the Yanukovych government, in the so-called Revolution of Dignity.

Politics
Nayyem was included in the electoral list of Petro Poroshenko Bloc (PPB) and elected to the Verkhovna Rada (Ukraine's national parliament) on the parliamentary elections of October 26, 2014. He was one of dozens of Euromaidan activists who pivoted from street politics into politics, where they sought to spearhead reform and turn Ukraine into a prosperous European state. Nayyem was a member of the Committee of the Verkhovna Rada on issues of European integration. At the Rada session of 2 December 2014 he was the only deputy who voted against the cabinet of Arseniy Yatsenyuk. Gradually he began to criticize the Petro Poroshenko Bloc (PPB) more and more and stopped voting in sync with it. According to deputy head of the PPB faction Oleksiy Honcharenko by February 2019 he had not attended PPB faction meetings for several years.

In August 2016 Nayyem joined the (political party) Democratic Alliance. From Autumn 2015 until June 2016, he had been part of an attempt to form a political party around then Governor of Odessa Oblast Mikheil Saakashvili with members of the parliamentary group Interfactional Union "Eurooptimists", Democratic Alliance and possibly Self Reliance until this projection collapsed in June 2016.

On 28 February 2019 Nayyem voluntarily left the BPP faction.

On 21 June 2019 Nayyem announced that he would not take part in the 2019 Ukrainian parliamentary election. Newspaper The Economist described him in 2017 as a reformist parliamentarian.

In November 2019 Nayyem was appointed Deputy Director General of Ukroboronprom. He was dismissed from this position on 29 April 2021 due to the position being abolished (which had not been communicated to him).

From 4 August 2021 to 28 January 2023 Nayyem was Deputy Minister of Infrastructure.

On 28 January 2023 the Cabinet of Ministers of Ukraine appointed Nayyem as head of the State Agency for Restoration and Infrastructure Development.

Cultural print in Ukrainian politics
Ukrainian entertaining group "Kvartal 95" mentioned Nayyem in their song about Ihor Kolomoyskyi (the name of latter omitted in the song) and their meeting in relation to the "Ukrnafta issue" that surfaced in the Ukrainian media soon after Euromaidan events.

Awards and honors

In 2010, Nayyem was awarded the Oleksandr Kryvenko prize "For Progress In Journalism" and in 2014 the prize of Gerd Bucerius Prize for Free Press in Eastern Europe.

Notes

References

External links 

 
 Nayem's blog at Ukrayinska Pravda
 Mustafa Nayem: "For a journalist it is silly to be proud of one's honesty; it is included in a set of his professional values". Interview to the Telekritika portal.
 Mustafa-Masi Nayyem on the Verkhovna Rada website

1981 births
Living people
Afghan emigrants to Ukraine
Ukrainian Muslims
Ukrainian journalists
21st-century journalists
People from Kabul
Kyiv Polytechnic Institute alumni
People of the Euromaidan
Hromadske.TV people
TVi (TV channel) people
Eighth convocation members of the Verkhovna Rada
Independent politicians of Petro Poroshenko Bloc
Ukrayinska Pravda
Ukrainian anti-corruption activists
Ukrainian people of Pashtun descent
Democratic Alliance (Ukraine) politicians
21st-century Ukrainian politicians
Afghan emigrants to the Soviet Union
Free Media Awards winners